Colpitts Grange is a hamlet in Northumberland, England.

Governance 
Colpitts Grange is in the parliamentary constituency of Hexham.

References

External links

Villages in Northumberland